Perineology is a speciality dealing with the functional troubles of the three axes (urological, gynaecological and coloproctological) of the female perineum. The perineologist takes a holistic approach, using defect-specific and mini-invasive treatments.

History of the term 
The word perineology represents a neologism. It was invented for the occasion of the 1st International Symposium on Perineology, held in Venice in 1990 to reflect an integrated view of the anatomy, physiology and pathology of the pelvic floor. It was popularized by the Italian journal Rivista Italiana di Colon-Proctologia.

Some physicians in France and Italy prefer to use the broader term “pelviperineology”, which reflect a broader multidisciplinary approach to all the aspects of the management of the pelvic floor.

In 2010, an International Society for Pelviperineology was formed.

References

External links
 European Perineology Group - GEP Up to date information about this new speciality by the group who has defined the concept. 
 Pelviperineology The Open Access Journal who consider all the compartments of the pelvis and of the perineum, with the body around and the mind above, as a single unit.

Gynaecology
Urology